Northern Ireland competed at the 2018 Commonwealth Games in the Gold Coast, Australia from April 4 to April 15, 2018. On January 3, 2017 Northern Ireland announced its decision to send a squad of 88 athletes to the games. A final team of 90 competed.

Netball athlete Caroline O’Hanlon was the country's flag bearer during the opening ceremony.

Medalists

Competitors
The following is the list of number of competitors participating at the Games per sport/discipline.

Athletics

Northern Ireland competed with a team of 13 athletes (8 men, 5 women) at the 2018 Commonwealth Games.

Men
Track & road events

Field events

Women
Track & road events

Field events

Combined events – Heptathlon

Badminton

Northern Ireland competed with a team of 3 athletes (1 man, 2 women) at the 2018 Commonwealth Games.

Boxing

Northern Ireland competed with a team of 12 athletes (8 men, 4 women) at the 2018 Commonwealth Games.

Men

Women

Cycling

Northern Ireland competed with a team of 8 athletes (5 men, 3 women) at the 2018 Commonwealth Games.

Road
Men

Women

Track
Sprint

Keirin

Time trial

Pursuit

Points race

Scratch race

Mountain bike

Gymnastics

Northern Ireland competed with a team of 2 athletes (2 men) at the 2018 Commonwealth Games.

Artistic

Men
Individual Qualification

Individual Finals

Lawn bowls

Northern Ireland competed with a team of 10 athletes (5 men, 5 women) at the 2018 Commonwealth Games.

Men

Women

Netball
The Northern Ireland national netball team qualified for the Netball at the 2018 Commonwealth Games due to being ranked in the top 11 of the INF World Rankings on July 1, 2017. Northern Ireland announced its team of 12 athletes on January 3, 2017. 2018 saw Northern Ireland make their second appearance at the Commonwealth Games. Netball team captain, Caroline O'Hanlon, carried the flag of Northern Ireland during the 2018 Commonwealth Games opening ceremony. Northern Ireland eventually finished eighth after losing to Malawi by 60–52 in a classification match.

Pool A

Seventh place match

Shooting

Northern Ireland competed with a team of 8 athletes (6 men, 2 women) at the 2018 Commonwealth Games.

Men

Women

Open

Swimming

Northern Ireland competed with a team of 9 athletes (8 men, 1 woman) at the 2018 Commonwealth Games.

Men

* Participated in heats only.

Women

Table tennis

Northern Ireland competed with a team of 4 athletes (4 men) at the 2018 Commonwealth Games.

Singles

Doubles

Team

Triathlon

Northern Ireland competed with a team of 3 athletes (3 men) at the 2018 Commonwealth Games.

Individual

Paratriathlon

Weightlifting

Northern Ireland competed with a team of 5 athletes (3 men, 2 women) at the 2018 Commonwealth Games.

Wrestling

Northern Ireland competed with a team of 1 athlete (1 woman) at the 2018 Commonwealth Games.

References

Nations at the 2018 Commonwealth Games
Northern Ireland at the Commonwealth Games
2018 in Northern Ireland sport